Eta Antliae (η Ant, η Antliae) is the Bayer designation for a double star in the southern constellation of Antlia. The brighter component has an apparent visual magnitude of  5.222, making it visible to the naked eye.

The main component has a stellar classification of F1 V, which indicates that it is an F-type main sequence star. This star has 55% more mass than the Sun. It shines with 6.6 times the Sun's luminosity at an effective temperature of 7,132 K. This heat gives it the yellow-white glow of an F-type star. It has a faint companion located 31 arcseconds away with an apparent magnitude of +11.3. Most likely this pair form a binary star system.

References

086629
Antliae, Eta
Antlia
F-type giants
048926
3947
Durchmusterung objects